Judi Scott (1957–2018) was a British theatrical, film and television actress.

Credits

Theatre
 Absurdia at the Donmar Warehouse
 The Romans In Britain at the Sheffield Crucible

Film and TV
 "Mr. Turner" (directed by Mike Leigh)
 High Hopes (directed by Mike Leigh)
 Vera Drake (directed by Mike Leigh)
 News Hounds (directed by Les Blair)
 Between The Lines (TV series), Series 1, Episode 8, as Inspector Jane Toynton (directed by Tom Clegg)
 Bliss (directed by Les Blair)
 Milk (directed by William Brookfield)
 My Brother Tom (directed by Dom Rotheroe)
 Midsomer Murders (directed by Jeremy Silberston)

Awards
Cannes Television Film Awards 1992: Best Actress for BBC Screen One Tell Me That You Love Me''.

Personal

References

External links

British actresses
British stage actresses
British film actresses
British television actresses
Living people
Place of birth missing (living people)
1957 births